The Miguel Alemán Dam is on the Tonto River in the Papaloapan Region of Oaxaca state in southern Mexico, just upstream from the town of Temascal or Nuevo Soyaltepec, forming the Miguel Alemán Lake with an area of 47,800 hectares.
The dam operates in conjunction with the Cerro de Oro Dam, located on the Santo Domingo River to control floods in the Papaloapan basin in Veracruz state.
Together with the 22,000 hectare reservoir of the Cerro de Oro, which is joined by a channel to the Miguel Alemán Lake, the combined capacity is 13,380 million cubic metres.
The lake formed by the dam is scenic, providing income from fishing and tourism. The northwestern shore and islands have been declared a nature reserve.
The dam includes the Temascal hydroelectric plant.

Purpose

The Santo Domingo and the Tonto rivers join to the south of the city of San Juan Bautista Tuxtepec to form the Papaloapan river, which meanders northeastward to the Gulf of Mexico. The basin of this river in the coastal plain was subject to frequent flooding, with the damage sometimes compounded by cyclones. A particularly severe flood in September 1944 covered 470,000 hectares, with great loss of life and property. The Miguel Aleman dam reduced the problem, although floods continued and the Cerro de Oro Dam on the Santo Domingo was required to fully control the floods.

Construction and capacity

The dam was initiated by the government of President Miguel Alemán Valdés in 1947 and construction started in 1949. The dam was named for the president's father, Miguel Alemán González. The dam created a  reservoir, provided a large portion of the region's growing electricity demand and provided an assured irrigation supply for thousands of new fruit, dairy, and vegetable farms. 
However, the project required relocation of thousands of poor Mazatec, Chinantec and Mixe families. There been a re-evaluation of the project's impact on the environment.

The dam has a capacity of 8 million m3 (2,113,400,000 US gallons), from which 6.77 million m3 (1,788,500,000 US gallons) is available for power generation.
The Temascal hydroelectric plant located east of the dam generates about 725 million kilowatts a year.

References

Further reading
 Ballesteros Porta, Juan. La colonizatión en la Cuenca del Papaloapan; una evaluación socioeconómica. [México] Centro de Investigaciones Agrarias [c1970]
 Cosby, Patrick H. "Leviathan in the Tropics: A postcolonial environmental history of the Papaloapan Development Projects in Mexico." PhD dissertation, University of Florida 2011.
 Poleman, Thomas T. The Papaloapan project; agricultural development in the Mexican tropics.Stanford, Calif., Stanford University Press, 1964.
 Scherr, Sara J. Development and equity in tropical Mexico: Thirty years of the Papaloapan Project. Ithaca, N. Y. : Department of Agricultural Economics, New York State College of Agriculture and Life Sciences, Cornell University, 1983.

Dams in Mexico
Buildings and structures in Oaxaca
Dams completed in 1954